The 2016 AON Open Challenger was a professional tennis tournament played on clay courts. It was the fourteenth edition of the tournament which was part of the 2016 ATP Challenger Tour. It took place in Genoa, Italy between 5 and 11 September 2016.

Singles main-draw entrants

Seeds

 1 Rankings are as of August 29, 2016.

Other entrants
The following players received wildcards into the singles main draw:
  Nicolás Almagro
  Gianluigi Quinzi
  Denis Istomin
  Edoardo Eremin

The following player received entry into the singles main draw as an alternate:
  Lorenzo Sonego

The following players received entry from the qualifying draw:
  Hubert Hurkacz
  Danilo Petrović
  Dino Marcan
  Gianluca Mager

Champions

Singles

  Jerzy Janowicz def.  Nicolás Almagro  7–6(7–5), 6–4

Doubles

  Julio Peralta /  Horacio Zeballos def.  Aliaksandr Bury /  Andrei Vasilevski, 6–4, 6–3.

External links
Official Website

AON Open Challenger
AON Open Challenger
2016 in Italian tennis
September 2016 sports events in Europe
21st century in Genoa